Elazığ Atatürk Stadium was a stadium in Elazığ, Turkey. It had a capacity of 14,467 spectators. It was the home of Elazığspor. After renovations in 2012, the stadium has an under-soil heating system, also the pitch was replaced by an upgraded version, the V.I.P section was also upgraded. In 2019, it was demolished to make way for a new stadium on the site.

References

Football venues in Turkey
Sports venues completed in 1974
Elazığspor
Things named after Mustafa Kemal Atatürk